Carnforth is a small town in  Lancashire, England.

Carnforth may also refer to:

 Carnforth, Iowa, a community in the United States
 Carnforth railway station, a railway station that serves the town of Carnforth, England
 Carnforth Cricket Club, a cricket club based at Lodge Quarry, Carnforth, England
 Carnforth High School, a high school in Carnforth, England